The 2019 Horizon League women's soccer tournament was the postseason women's soccer tournament for the Horizon League. It was held from November 4 through November 9, 2018. The quarterfinals of the tournament were held at campus sites, while semifinals and final took place at Engelmann Field in Milwaukee, Wisconsin. The six team single-elimination tournament consisted of three rounds based on seeding from regular season conference play. The Milwaukee Panthers were the defending champions, and they successfully defended their title by beating the UIC Flames 2–0 in the final. This was the twelfth overall title for Milwaukee and second for head coach Troy Fabiano.

Bracket

Semifinal matchups were determined by the results of the quarterfinals. The #1 seed would play the lowest-remaining seed, while the #2 seed would play the other quarterfinal winner.

Schedule

Quarterfinals

Semifinals

Final

Statistics

Goalscorers 
2 Goals
Haley Johnson (Milwaukee)
Shawna Zaken (Northern Kentucky)

1 Goal
Sydni Callahan (Wright State)
Sami Lopez (Oakland)
Nikki May (Oakland)
Lindsey Meyer (Northern Kentucky)
Rachel Phillpotts (Milwaukee)
Cassidy Privett (UIC)
Alexa Sabbagh (Oakland)
Mackenzie Schill (Milwaukee)

All-Tournament team

Source:

MVP in bold

References 

2019 Horizon League women's soccer season
Horizon League Women's Soccer Tournament